The Liberator is an American adult animated war drama miniseries created and written by Jeb Stuart. It is based on the book The Liberator: One World War II Soldier’s 500-Day Odyssey by Alex Kershaw.

Directed by Greg Jonkajtys, the miniseries was released on November 11, 2020 on Netflix.

Synopsis
The Liberator takes place during World War II where maverick U.S. Army officer Felix Sparks and the 157th Infantry Regiment fought for over five hundred days alongside the Allied forces during the Italian campaign.

The Liberator is a character-driven action miniseries based on the true story of World War II infantry commander Felix "Shotgun" Sparks (played by Bradley James), who led the members of the 157th Infantry Regiment of the 45th Infantry Division, an integrated group of white cowboys, Mexican Americans and Native soldiers drawn from across the west.  Sparks and his battalion of "Thunderbirds" were classic citizen soldiers, and for over 500 days they led a special group of American soldiers from Italy to France to the liberation of the Dachau concentration camp, through some of the most grueling battles of the war, becoming one of the most decorated American combat units of World War II. The unit received eight combat awards for service in Italy, France, Germany and Central Europe

Cast
 Bradley James as Felix Sparks
 Jose Miguel Vasquez as Able Gomez 
 Martin Sensmeier as Samuel Coldfoot
 Billy Breed as Private Vacarro  
 Forrest Goodluck as Private Cloudfeather
 Bryan Hibbard as Corporal Hallowell
 James Oliver Wheatley as Sergeant Reed
 Tatanka Means as Private Otaktay 
 Kiowa Gordon as Corporal Kanuna 
 Matt Mercurio as Private Cordosa
 Michael Shaeffer as Pop Bullock 
 Sam Gittins as Junior Bullock 
 Pedro Leandro as Private Garcia
 Finney Cassidy as Michigan 
 Jacob Collins-Levy as Corporal Tucker 
 Billy Rayner as Jim Taylor
 Harrison Stone as Lieutenant Childers

Episodes

Production
Announced in November 2018, the miniseries's production would be handled by A&E Studios and Unique Features with animation services by Atlanta-based studio School of Humans. In January 2019, Bradley James was cast in the leading role of Felix Sparks and Martin Sensmeier was cast as Samuel Coldfoot. Later, the animation team behind the series launched Trioscope Studios, with the show as its first series in production. On November 9, Brandon Barr, chief content officer at Trioscope Studios, was interviewed. He stated that the project was "particularly challenging" and a lot of work, while arguing that anime opened the door for other visual techniques and styles. He also hoped that the company could be part of "bringing nuanced emotional drama to that broader adult animation push."

The miniseries was the first to use Trioscope Enhanced Hybrid Animation, a technique that blends live-action actors with CGI. According to its developers, L.C. Crowley and Grzegorz Jonkajtys, the technique gives off “unprecedented level of emotion and fidelity to the animated drama experience.”

Release
The limited series was released on Veterans Day, November 11, 2020.

Reception
On Rotten Tomatoes, the miniseries holds an approval rating of 64% based on 11 reviews, with an average rating of 7.15/10. The website's critics consensus reads, "The Liberator eccentric animation gives it some creative gloss, but clichéd storytelling and stock characters keep this World War II tale from being wholly salute-worthy." On Metacritic, it has a weighted average score of 59 out of 100 based on 7 reviews, indicating "mixed or average reviews".

Reviewing the miniseries for Rolling Stone, Alan Sepinwall gave it 3.5 out of 5 stars and said, "The Liberator more often than not is an effective reminder about why pop culture keeps revisiting World War II material again and again." On contrast, Daniel Fienberg of The Hollywood Reporter called the show a series which is "very watchable" but is infuriating due to its "inconsistent focus and narrative choices" even though his interest never wavered due to the interesting and "eye-popping" animation. Fienberg concluded that people should check out the show for the animation, for a commemoration of Veterans Days but to be prepared for frustration over "how much more complicated, and how much richer" the actual history is and how the show could have been better.

References

External links 
 
 
 

2020s American drama television miniseries
2020 American television series debuts
2020 American television series endings
2020s American adult animated television series
Animated television series by Netflix
Books adapted into television series
English-language Netflix original programming
Television series based on actual events
Television series based on books
War television series
World War II television drama series
Fiction about the United States Army
Television series about the United States Army